Narendra Singh Tomar (born 12 June 1957) is an Indian politician and a member of the 17th Lok Sabha. He is the incumbent Minister of Agriculture & Farmers Welfare. He has been Minister of Rural Development, Minister of Panchayati Raj, Minister of Mines and Minister of Parliamentary Affairs in the Government of India during different periods of the First and Second Modi ministry. He is a leader of Bharatiya Janata Party. He was also a member of Fifteenth Lok Sabha from 2009 to 2014 from Morena and Sixteenth Lok Sabha from 2014 to 2019 from Gwalior. In 2019, he changed his constituency and was re-elected to the Lok Sabha from Morena.

Early life and education
Tomar was born on 12 June 1957 in Morar village in Gwalior district (of Madhya Pradesh) in a Rajput family to Munshi Singh Tomar and Sharda Devi Tomar. He graduated from Jiwaji University. He is married to Kiran Tomar, with whom he has two sons and a daughter. He was nicknamed as Munna Bhaiya by Babulal Gaur.

Political career
He was appointed Union Cabinet Minister of Steel, Mines, Labour and Employment on 27 May 2014 in the cabinet headed by Narendra Modi. He was administered the oath of office and sworn in on 26 May 2014 by Pranab Mukherjee, the President of India.

On 5 July 2016, during the second cabinet reshuffle of the Narendra Modi ministry, Birender Singh replaced him as the Steel Minister and he replaced Birender Singh as the Minister of Panchayati Raj, Rural Development and Drinking Water and Sanitation. Piyush Goyal replaced Narendra Singh Tomar as the Minister of Mines (Minister of State with Independent charge).

In May 2019, he continued with Ministry of Rural Development and Panchayati Raj and was given charge of Ministry of Agriculture and Farmers Welfare.

On 18 September 2020, Tomar was assigned the additional charge of the Ministry of Food Processing Industries after Harsimrat Kaur Badal resigned from the post.

Offices held

References

 

 

1957 births
Living people
Jiwaji University alumni
India MPs 2009–2014
India MPs 2014–2019
People from Gwalior
Lok Sabha members from Madhya Pradesh
Mining ministers of India
Rajya Sabha members from Madhya Pradesh
Labour ministers of India
Bharatiya Janata Party politicians from Madhya Pradesh
Narendra Modi ministry
Agriculture Ministers of India
Steel Ministers of India
Members of the Cabinet of India